An interior ministry (sometimes ministry of internal affairs or ministry of home affairs) is a government ministry typically responsible for policing, emergency management, national security, civil defence, supervision of local governments, conduct of elections, public administration and immigration matters. The ministry is often headed by a minister of the interior or a minister of home affairs. 

In some countries, police and security are controlled by a separated ministry. For example, Greece's Ministry of Public Order and Citizen Protection and Minister of Public Security of Israel. Other countries have also different tasks being entitled to the namely Ministry of the Interior. Not always reflects the naming of the ministry the portfolio behind. For example, Ethiopia's Ministry of Peace has the classical portfolio of an interior ministry but is not named so.

This list contains female ministers that had served or currently serving as Minister of Interior, which in charge, mainly of local governments, elections, and public administrations (justice, security, and policing also included if still managed under same ministry).

Sovereign states

Italics denotes an acting interior minister

Constituent and dependent territories

See also
Interior ministry
List of current interior ministers

Notes

External links
Female Interior Ministers
Rulers.org List of rulers throughout time and places

 
Interior
interior ministers